Cypress is a former provincial electoral district  for the Legislative Assembly of the province of Saskatchewan, Canada. This district was created before the 3rd Saskatchewan general election in 1912 as "Gull Lake". Since the district encompassed most of the Saskatchewan side of the Cypress Hills, the riding was renamed "Cypress" in 1917. Redrawn and renamed "Shaunavon" before 1934, the constituency was abolished before the 9th Saskatchewan general election in 1938.

It is now part of the Cypress Hills and Wood River constituencies.

Members of the Legislative Assembly

Election results

Gull Lake (1912 – 1917)

|-

 
|Conservative
|James Beck Swanston
|align="right"|610
|align="right"|48.92%
|align="right"|–
|- bgcolor="white"
!align="left" colspan=3|Total
!align="right"|1,247
!align="right"|100.00%
!align="right"|

Cypress (1917 – 1934)

|-

 
|Conservative
|James Beck Swanston
|align="right"|1,670
|align="right"|46.40%
|align="right"|-2.52
|- bgcolor="white"
!align="left" colspan=3|Total
!align="right"|3,599
!align="right"|100.00%
!align="right"|

|-

|- bgcolor="white"
!align="left" colspan=3|Total
!align="right"|Acclamation
!align="right"|

|-

|- bgcolor="white"
!align="left" colspan=3|Total
!align="right"|2,281
!align="right"|100.00%
!align="right"|

|-
 
|style="width: 130px"|Conservative
|John Edward Gryde
|align="right"|2,947
|align="right"|66.42%
|align="right"|-

|- bgcolor="white"
!align="left" colspan=3|Total
!align="right"|4,437
!align="right"|100.00%
!align="right"|

Shaunavon (1934 – 1938)

|-
 
|style="width: 130px"|Farmer-Labour
|Clarence Stork
|align="right"|2,061
|align="right"|37.87%
|align="right"|-

 
|Conservative
|John Edward Gryde
|align="right"|1,470
|align="right"|27.01%
|align="right"|-39.41
|- bgcolor="white"
!align="left" colspan=3|Total
!align="right"|5,442
!align="right"|100.00%
!align="right"|

See also
Electoral district (Canada)
List of Saskatchewan provincial electoral districts
List of Saskatchewan general elections
List of political parties in Saskatchewan
Gull Lake, Saskatchewan

References
Saskatchewan Archives Board – Saskatchewan Election Results By Electoral Division

Former provincial electoral districts of Saskatchewan
Gull Lake No. 139, Saskatchewan